The 2016 BET Hip Hop Awards were held on September 17, 2016 and aired on October 4, 2016 at Atlanta’s Cobb Energy Performing Arts Centre. The nominations were announced on August 18, 2016. 
For a third consecutive year, Drake heads the list of nominations for the BET Hip-Hop Awards. His 14 nods include Album of the Year, Best Live Performer, Lyricist of the Year, Best Hip-Hop Video and three in the Best Collabo, Duo or Group category.

Drake will be going up against other top nominees Future (with 10 nods), DJ Khaled (nine) and Kanye West (eight) in several of those categories. One of the most closely watched races will be Best New Hip-Hop Artist, whose nominees including Anderson .Paak, Bryson Tiller (who won that award and Best Male R&B/Pop Artist at June’s BET Awards), Chance the Rapper, Desiigner and Tory Lanez.

Performances
Gucci Mane - "First Day Out" and "First Day Out Tha Feds" plus "Last Time" featuring Travis Scott and "Pick up the Phone featuring Young Thug & Quavo
Dae Dae – "Wat U Mean (Aye, Aye, Aye)"
DRAM featuring Lil Yachty – "One Night" and "Broccoli"
O.T. Genasis – "Push It" and "Cut It"
Young M.A – "OOOUUU"
Lil Uzi Vert – "Money Longer"
21 Savage – "X"
Isaiah Rashad – "Tity and Dolla"
T.I. – "We Will Not"
Desiigner – "Tiimmy Turner"
Jalen Jackson - "Panda"

Cyphers

Cypher 1 – Peedi Crakk, Neef, Omillio Sparks, Freeway & Beanie Sigel of State Property
Cypher 2 – Don Q, Russ, A Boogie Wit Da Hoodie, Kent Jones & Nick Grant
Cypher 3 – Sam Black, Ms. Jade, Kur, Dave East & Young M.A
Live Cypher – Oswin Benjamin, Locksmith & M-1 & Stic of Dead Prez
Cypher 4 – Mike Biv, Bre-Z, Yazz The Greatest & Big Ron DeVoe
Cypher 5 – Aaron Cook$, 3D Na'Tee, Rain 910, Consequence & Jidenna
Cypher 6 – Lil Wayne & Chocolate Droppa (aka Kevin Hart)

Winners and nominations

Best Hip Hop Video 
Drake – "Hotline Bling"
 2 Chainz – "Watch Out"
 Desiigner – "Panda"
 DJ Khaled featuring Jay Z & Future – "I Got the Keys"
 Fat Joe & Remy Ma featuring French Montana & Infared – "All the Way Up"
 Kanye West featuring Rihanna – "Famous"

Best Collabo, Duo or Group 
Fat Joe & Remy Ma featuring French Montana & Infared – "All the Way Up"
 Drake featuring Wizkid & Kyla – "One Dance"
 Drake & Future – "Jumpman"
 DJ Khaled featuring Jay Z & Future – "I Got the Keys"
 DJ Khaled featuring Drake – "For Free"

Best Live Performer 
Kendrick Lamar
 Drake
 Future
 J. Cole
 Kanye West

Lyricist of the Year 
Kendrick Lamar
 Chance the Rapper
 Drake
 J. Cole
 Kanye West

Video Director of the Year  
Director X
 Benny Boom
 Colin Tilley
 Hype Williams
 Kanye West

DJ of the Year 
DJ Khaled
 DJ Drama
 DJ Envy
 DJ Esco
 DJ Mustard

Producer of the Year 
Metro Boomin
 DJ Mustard
 Dr. Dre
 Mike WiLL Made It
 Pharrell
 Mario Judah

MVP of the Year 
DJ Khaled
 Drake
 Future
 Kanye West
 Kendrick Lamar

Track of the Year 
Only the producer of the track nominated in this category.

"All the Way Up" – Produced by Cool & Dre and Edsclusive (Fat Joe & Remy Ma featuring French Montana & Infared)
 "Controlla" – Produced by Boi-1da (Drake)
 "Hotline Bling" – Produced by Nineteen85 (Drake)
 "I Got the Keys" – Produced by Southside (DJ Khaled featuring Jay Z & Future)
 "Panda" – Produced by Menace (Desiigner)

Album of the Year 
Drake – Views
 DJ Khaled – I Changed a Lot
 Dr. Dre – Compton
 Fetty Wap – Fetty Wap
 Future – DS2
 Kanye West – The Life of Pablo

Best New Hip Hop Artist 
Chance the Rapper
 Anderson .Paak
 Bryson Tiller
 Desiigner
 Tory Lanez

Hustler of the Year 
DJ Khaled
 Drake
 Future
 Jay Z
 Kanye West

Made-You-Look Award 
Kanye West
 A$AP Rocky
 Drake
 Future
 Nicki Minaj

Best Mixtape 
Chance the Rapper – Coloring Book
 French Montana – Wave Gods (Hosted by Max B)
 Future – Purple Reign
 Lil Uzi Vert – Lil Uzi Vert vs. the World
 Young Thug – Slime Season 3

Sweet 16: Best Featured Verse 
Kendrick Lamar – "Freedom" (Beyoncé featuring Kendrick Lamar)
 2 Chainz – "No Problem" (Chance the Rapper featuring Lil Wayne & 2 Chainz)
 Drake – "Work" (Rihanna featuring Drake)
 Kodak Black – "Lockjaw" (French Montana featuring Kodak Black)
 Nicki Minaj – "Down in the DM (Remix)" (Yo Gotti featuring Nicki Minaj)

Impact Track 
J. Cole – "Love Yourz"
 Jay Z – "Spiritual"
 Jidenna – "Long Live the Chief"
 Raury – "Trap Tears"
 Sir the Baptist featuring ChuchPeople – "Raise Hell"

People's Champ Award 
Travis Scott – "Antidote"
 Desiigner – "Panda"
 DJ Khaled featuring Drake – "For Free"
 Fat Joe & Remy Ma featuring French Montana & Infared – "All the Way Up"
 O.T. Genasis featuring Young Dolph – "Cut It"
 Young Thug – "Best Friend"

References

BET Hip Hop Awards